The Beach Waterpark may refer to:
The Beach at Adventure Landing, a waterpark in Mason, Ohio.
The Beach (waterpark), a closed waterpark in Albuquerque, New Mexico.

See also
 Beach
 The Beach (disambiguation)